The Continental Clay Brick Plant in Martinsburg, West Virginia includes a number of beehive brick kilns.  Originally a coal-fired brickworks, it was later converted to natural gas. The kilns are now largely disused, except for a few used to dry sand.

References

External links 
 Continental Brick Company

Industrial buildings and structures on the National Register of Historic Places in West Virginia
Buildings and structures in Martinsburg, West Virginia
National Register of Historic Places in Martinsburg, West Virginia
Kilns
Brickworks in the United States